Howard Lawrence may refer to:

Howard Lawrence, member of the band Disclosure
Howard C. Lawrence, American politician from Michigan